Noble Consort Wan (17 November 1835 – 20 June 1894), of the Manchu Plain White Banner Socoro clan, was a consort of Xianfeng Emperor.

Life

Family background 
Noble Consort Wan was a member of Manchu Plain White Banner Socoro clan. Her personal name was Zhaoge (招格)

Father: Kuizhao, served as a member of Grand Council in 1814 and first rank literary official in 1842.

 Paternal grandfather: Yinghe (英和), a tutor of Crown Prince in 1793, a member of Grand Council and a secretary in the Ministry of Revenue.
 Paternal grandmother：Lady Sakda
 Paternal great aunt: Noble Lady Rui (瑞贵人)
One sister: a wife of supporter general Zaikun (辅国将军 载坤)

One elder brother: Xizhi (锡祉), an official (官员)

Daoguang era 
Noble Consort Wan was born on 17 November 1835.

Xianfeng era 
Lady Socoro entered the Forbidden city in 1851, and was given the title of "First class female attendant Wan" (婉常在; "wan" meaning "tactfull"). There was discussion in imperial court to bestow her a title "Noble Lady". Xianfeng Emperor cut on discussion assuming that lady Socoro didn't deserve a title "Noble Lady" in spite of her noble and illustrious family background. Instead, the emperor gave a title "Noble Lady" to Ugiya Qiyun, his former mistress.  Lady Socoro lived in Chengqian palace under the supervision of Concubine Yun. In June 1852, she travelled to Yuanmingyuan with her servants. At that time, court painters were ordered to create portraits of imperial concubines. Her portrait was delivered to Ruyi Pavilion in the garden. In October 1852, she was promoted to "Noble Lady Wan" (婉贵人). In 1855, her status was elevated to "Concubine Wan" (婉嬪), but the ceremony was delayed until 1856 due to mourning period after Empress Dowager Kangci. She moved to Jingren palace after the promotion. She remained childless during Xianfeng era.

Tongzhi era 
In 1861, after the coronation of Tongzhi Emperor, Lady Socoro and other consorts of the previous emperor were promoted. Lady Socoro was elevated to "Consort Wan" (婉妃). In 1874, she was promoted to "Noble Consort Wan" (婉貴妃).

Guangxu era 
Noble Consort Wan died on 20 June 1894. Her coffin was interred in Ding Mausoleum of the Eastern Qing tombs in 1897.

Titles
 During the reign of the Daoguang Emperor (r. 1820–1850):
 Lady Socolo (from 17 November 1835)
 During the reign of the Xianfeng Emperor (r. 1850–1861):
 First class female attendant Wan (from 1851), seventh rank consort 
 Noble Lady Wan (from October 1852), sixth rank consort
 Concubine Wan (from 1855), fifth rank consort 
 During the reign of the Tongzhi Emperor (r. 1861–1875):
 Consort Wan (from 1861), fourth rank consort 
 Noble Consort Wan (from 1874), third rank consort

See also
 Ranks of imperial consorts in China#Qing
 Royal and noble ranks of the Qing dynasty

References 

Consorts of the Xianfeng Emperor
1835 births
1894 deaths